Woman in the River (German: Frau im Strom) is a 1939 drama film directed by Gerhard Lamprecht and starring Hertha Feiler, Attila Hörbiger and Oskar Sima. The film was made by Wien-Film, a Vienna-based company set up after Austria had been incorporated into Greater Germany following the 1938 Anschluss.

Cast
 Hertha Feiler as Hannerl 
 Attila Hörbiger as Alois Händerl  
 Oskar Sima as Schani  
 Fritz Rasp as Wendelin  
 Alexander Trojan as Franz Schatter  
 Herbert Gernot as Brunner  
 Werner Scharf as Keryllis  
 Olly Holzmann as Hedi 
 Rudolf Carl as Polizeibeamter 
 Kurt Filipp as Ein Junge  
 Karl Forest as Angler 
Willi Hufnagel as 2. Wachmann 
 Hans Kammauf as 3. Wachmann  
 Oskar Wegrostek as 1. Wachmann  
 Lisl Kinast as Liebende  
Alfred Lehner as Liebender 
 Eduard Spieß as Bäugerl  
 Ferry Wondra as Strassenbahnschafner

References

External links 
 

1939 films
Films of Nazi Germany
German drama films
1939 drama films
Films directed by Gerhard Lamprecht
Films set in Vienna
Terra Film films
German black-and-white films
1930s German films